Carolyn H. Krause (born October 20, 1938 in Milwaukee, Wisconsin) was a Republican member of the Illinois House of Representatives, and represented the 66th district from 1993 to her retirement in 2009.

Krause graduated from University of Wisconsin–Madison and received her law degree from Chicago-Kent College of Law. She was previously mayor of Mount Prospect, Illinois from 1977 to 1989 and defeated David Harris in the 1992 Republican Primary. After she announced her retirement in 2008, Republican nominee and Elk Grove Village Trustee Christine Prochno and Democratic nominee Mark L. Walker faced off against each other. Walker won the election.

Notes

External links
Representative Carolyn H. Krause (R) 66th District official Illinois General Assembly site
Bills Committees
 

Politicians from Milwaukee
People from Mount Prospect, Illinois
University of Wisconsin–Madison alumni
Mayors of places in Illinois
Republican Party members of the Illinois House of Representatives
Women state legislators in Illinois
1938 births
Living people
21st-century American politicians
21st-century American women politicians
Chicago-Kent College of Law alumni
Women mayors of places in Illinois